George MacDonald is a game designer who has worked primarily on role-playing games and in the computer game industry.

Career
George MacDonald started work on role-playing games while at college, by adding more detailed super powers to Gamescience's Superhero: 2044 RPG (1977) and ultimately creating his own original system which Steve Peterson typed up, and which eventually became the superhero RPG, Champions (1981). MacDonald and Peterson had only enough money to print 1,500 copies of the game and hand-collated the pages, and they sold their new game at Pacific Origins 1981; they were surprised to see it sell very well, selling 1,000 of their 1,500 copies at the convention. After this early success, MacDonald and Peterson started Hero Games as a publishing label. By 1982, they were ready to take the next step in turning Hero Games into a professional business, and opened up an office and asked Ray Greer to join them as a partner and handle marketing and sales, with Bruce Harlick soon joining them as Hero's first employee. Flying Buffalo and Hero Games formed an alliance thanks to a chance meeting between Michael Stackpole and MacDonald at a 1982 convention.

MacDonald later became Senior Game Developer at SSI. MacDonald was the developer on the Gold Box game Pool of Radiance (1988). MacDonald and Jeff Grubb authored the game module Curse of the Azure Bonds, which was released in April 1989 under Forgotten Realms Module FRC2.

References

External links
 George MacDonald at MobyGames
 George MacDonald at Pen & Paper RPG Database via Internet Archive

American video game producers
Dungeons & Dragons video game designers
Living people
Role-playing game designers
Year of birth missing (living people)